The 1986 Toledo Rockets football team was an American football team that represented the University of Toledo in the Mid-American Conference (MAC) during the 1986 NCAA Division I-A football season. In their fifth season under head coach Dan Simrell, the Rockets compiled a 7–4 record (5–3 against MAC opponents), finished in a tie for second place in the MAC, and outscored all opponents by a combined total of 216 to 197.

The team's statistical leaders included A. J. Sager with 1,107 passing yards, Kelvin Farmer with 1,532 rushing yards, and Eric Hutchinson with 504 receiving yards.

Schedule

References

Toledo
Toledo Rockets football seasons
Toledo Rockets football